Exiguobacterium soli is a psychrophilic bacterium from the genus of Exiguobacterium which has been isolated from the McMurdo Dry Valleys.

References

Bacillaceae
Bacteria described in 2008